Le cose che non ho (English: Things I don't have) is the fourth studio album by Italian singer-songwriter Marco Mengoni, released by Sony Music Italy on 4 December 2015. A single was released in promotion of the album: "Ti ho voluto bene veramente" (English: I really loved you) in October 2015. The album is the second of a two-album project with his third studio album Parole in circolo.

The album peaked at number one on the Italian FIMI albums chart in December 2015. In January 2016, it also became the first topper of the Italian Vinyl Albums Chart, introduced by FIMI during the first week of the year.

Track listing

Personnel
Marco Mengoni – Vocals, Backing vocals, Keyboards, Programming
Tim Pierce – Acoustic guitar, Electric guitar
Peter Cornacchia – Electric guitar
Michele Canova Iorfida – Keyboards, Synth, Programming
Alex Alessandroni Jr. – Piano, Hammond organ, Fender Rhodes
Giovanni Pallotti – Bass guitar
Christian "Noochie" Rigano – Keyboards, Synth, Programming
Jeff Babko – Piano, Hammond organ, Fender Rhodes
Sean Hurley – Bass guitar
Davide Sollazzi – Drums, Piano
Alessandro De Crescenzo – Electric guitar
Blair Sinta – Drums
Francesco Minutello – Trumpet
Marco Tamburini – Trumpet
Federico Pierantoni – Trombone
Roberto Rossi – Trombone
Mattia Dalla Pozza – Sax

Charts

Certifications

References

Marco Mengoni albums
2015 albums
Italian-language albums
Albums produced by Michele Canova